Strip the Cosmos is a documentary science television series narrated by Eric Loren. Aired by the Science Channel, it premiered on November 12, 2014.

Content
Strip The Cosmos builds upon a concept introduced in an earlier show, Strip the City — in which layers of a city were "stripped" away with computer-generated imagery to reveal what lay beneath them — and applies it to the universe as a whole. The series "strips" away layers of objects such as stars, planets, moons, comets, and black holes to reveal their interiors layer by layer and create a better understanding of how they originated, what makes them up, and how they work, with commentary by experts in astronomy and astrophysics. The series also describes space missions intended to expand human understanding of the universe.

Episode list

Season 1 (2014)
SOURCES Windfall Films Strip the Cosmos Series 1 Episode 1 Secrets of the Black Hole Accessed 31 October 2021Windfall Films Strip the Cosmos Series 1 Episode 3 Killer Asteroids Accessed 31 October 2021Windfall Films Strip the Cosmos Series 1 Episode 5 Alien Worlds Accessed 31 October 2021

Season 2 (2017)
SOURCES Windfall Films Strip the Cosmos Series 2 Episode 1 Secrets of the Black Hole Accessed 31 October 2021Windfall Films Strip the Cosmos Series 2 Episode 3 Hunt for the Big Bang Accessed 31 October 2021Windfall Films Strip the Cosmos Series 2 Episode 5 Mystery of the Hidden Universe Accessed 31 October 2021

Season 3 (2018)
SOURCES Windfall Films Strip the Cosmos Series 3 Episode 1 Mystery of the Alien Asteroid Accessed 31 October 2021Windfall Films Strip the Cosmos Series 3 Episode 3 The Moon's Dark Secret Accessed 31 October 2021Windfall Films Strip the Cosmos Series 3 Episode 5 Secret History of the Solar System Accessed 31 October 2021Windfall Films Strip the Cosmos Series 3 Episode 7 Secrets of the Alien Megastructure Accessed 31 October 2021Windfall Films Strip the Cosmos Series 3 Episode 9 Pluto's Strange Secrets Revealed Accessed 31 October 2021

Season 4 (2020)

SOURCES Windfall Films ‘’Strip the Cosmos’’ Series 4 Episode 1 Mission to Mars Accessed 1 November 2021Windfall Films ‘’Strip the Cosmos’’ Series 4 Episode 3 Life and Death of the Milky Way Accessed 1 November 2021Films ‘’Strip the Cosmos’’ Series 4 Episode 5 Secrets of the Asteroids  Accessed 1 November 2021[ https://www.windfallfilms.com/show/18349/mystery-of-the-dead-planets.aspx Windfall Films ‘’Strip the Cosmos’’ Series 4 Episode 7 Mystery of the Dead Planets Accessed 1 November 2021]

See also
Alien Planet
Cosmos: A Spacetime Odyssey
Extreme Universe
How the Universe Works
Into the Universe with Stephen Hawking
Killers of the Cosmos
Mars: The Secret Science
The Planets and Beyond
Space's Deepest Secrets
Strip the City
Through the Wormhole
The Universe

References

External links
Windfall Films Strip the Cosmos

2014 American television series debuts
2010s American documentary television series
2020s American documentary television series
Documentary television series about astronomy
Science Channel original programming